Rev. Joseph Everhart Boone (born September 19, 1922 in Cedartown, Georgia – July 15, 2006) was a civil rights activist and organizer who marched together with Martin Luther King Jr.

Biography
Joseph E. Boone was the son of John L. and Mattie Roberts Boone.

He attended the Huston–Tillotson University (1950) and earned a Bachelor of Divinity at the Gammon Theological Seminary in 1954.He was a member of the Kappa Alpha Psi fraternity.

Joseph E. Boone was a minister of the First Congregational Church in Anniston, Alabama from 1955 to 1959. From 1959 to 1980, he was Pastor of the Rush Memorial Congregational Church of the Atlanta University Center.

He was a key organizer of the Atlanta Movement, which led to the integration of lunch counters and department stores in Atlanta, during the early 1960s. He worked with King, Ralph David Abernathy, John Lewis and Andrew Young, but never was recognized to the same degree they were. In 1960, he encouraged Lonnie C. King Jr. (along with Julian Bond an others) to launch the Atlanta Student Movement.

King named Boone as the chief negotiator of Operation Breadbasket, a program that encouraged businesses that sold to African-Americans, to employ and promote African Americans. Boone led a team of more than 200 ministers in more than 30 cities for Operation Breadbasket. He was also in charge of the negotiations with the Atlanta School Committee for the desegregation of the city's school system.

In 1971, he was appointed Governor's Council on Human Relations by President Jimmy Carter. He was also a director of the P.J. Woods Center for the Blind and Senior Citizens where he developed the drug therapy program. Starting in 1974, he collaborated with F. W. Woolworth Company to improve the economic development of black communities. He was a chairman of the board of B.D.&O. Associates, Inc which oversaw the management of several other businesses. In 1985, he purchased a clothes and garments sewing plant that he integrated to B.D.&O.

Rev. Jesse Jackson took over for Boone afterwards.

Awards 

 1959: Civic Leader of the Year by the First Congregational Church
 1967: Excelsior Knights Citizenship Award
 1973: National Labor Relations Award
 2002: United Church of Christ Meritorious Award
 2003: Civil Rights Legend Award
 2006: International Civil Rights Walk of Fame Award

Personal life
Boone married Alethea Williams. They had two daughters: Jolaunda and Andrea.

Posthumous honors 
In March 2008 Boone's memory was honored when Simpson Road/Street in Northwest Atlanta was renamed Joseph E. Boone Blvd. in his honor.

References

External links
 Joseph E. Boone Memorial Foundation
Press clips on Civil Rights Digital Library

African-American Christian clergy
American Christian clergy
Activists for African-American civil rights
20th-century American clergy
African-American activists
21st-century American clergy
Huston–Tillotson University alumni
Interdenominational Theological Center alumni
People from Cedartown, Georgia
Activists from Georgia (U.S. state)
1922 births
2006 deaths